Two mayoral elections were held in Istanbul in 2019. The first on 31 March 2019 and the second on 23 June 2019.

March 2019 Istanbul mayoral election
June 2019 Istanbul mayoral election